Grimoart(z) Gausmar(s) was a Gascon troubadour of the third quarter of the twelfth century. The sole source of information about his life comes from a satire of Peire d'Alvernhe, which mentions that Grimoart was a knight and jongleur. Only one known poem by Grimoart has survived. The poet names himself in its last lines:

Grimoart's work is misattributed in two manuscripts to Jaufre Rudel. The misattribution probably stems from the similarity between the first lines of two works: Lanquan lo temps renovelha by Grimoart and Lanquan li jorn son lonc e may by Rudel. The influence of Marcabru comes across in the poem of Grimoart.

A hypothesis has been forwarded that Grimoart Gausmar is a corruption of the name of another troubadour, Guilhem Azemar, which the copyist and later Peire got wrong. It has not received widespread support.

Sources
Riquer, Martín de. Los trovadores: historia literaria y textos. 3 vol. Barcelona: Planeta, 1975.

Gascons
12th-century French troubadours